Himanshu Rai (1892 – 16 May 1940), one of the pioneers of Indian cinema, is best known as the founder of the  studio in 1934, along with Devika Rani. He was associated with a number of movies, including Goddess (1922), The Light of Asia (1925), Shiraz (1928), A Throw of Dice (1929) and Karma (1933). He was married to actress Devika Rani Chaudhuri (1929–1940).

Biography
Born into an aristocratic Bengali family, Rai spent several years in Santiniketan for his schooling. After obtaining a law-degree from Kolkata, he went to London to become a barrister. There, he met a playwright and screenwriter Niranjan Pal.

That association led to the making of a film, The Light of Asia, which he co-directed with Franz Osten. Rai was also one of the main actors in this film. While making his third film, Prapancha Pash, he met and fell in love with Devika Rani, a great-grandniece of the Nobel Laureate Rabindranath Tagore. Before this film was complete, he married her.

Bombay Talkies

At Bombay Talkies studio, Rai partnered with Sashadhar Mukherjee, and Mukherjee's brother in law worked as a technician in the studio. Due to suspected romantic liaisons between his wife and the leading man, Najmul Hasan, in Jeevan Naiya(film), Himanshu sacked the leading man and cast the gawky and reluctant brother-in-law Ashok Kumar as the leading man. Kumar went on to have a successful career in films.

After Rai's death, there was a struggle for studio control. His widow Devika Rani was in conflict with Sashadhar Mukherjee. Eventually there was dual control and alternate production of films by the two camps. During this era Mukherjee produced the studio's biggest hit Kismet in 1943. Then Mukherjee broke away to form Filmistan Studio in partnership, and Devika Rani, fully in charge of the studio, did not have as much success.

In 1945, Devika Rani married Svetoslav Roerich and moved away from Bombay and films. Ashok Kumar and Mukherjee made a bid to revive Bombay talkies and produced one big hit in Mahal. Eventually, the studio shut down and is now a decrepit property in Malad.

Filmography

Producer
 Kangan (1939) / The Bangle (English title)
 Izzat (1937)
 Jeevan Prabhat (1937)
 Savitri (1937)
 Achhut Kanya (1936) / Untouchable Girl (English title)
 Janmabhoomi (1936)
 Jeevan Naiya (1936)
 Jawani Ki Hawa (1935) / Leichtsinn der Jugend (Germany title)
 Karma (1933)
 Prapancha Pash (1929) / A Throw of Dice (English title) / Schicksalswürfel (Germany title)
 Shiraz (1928) / Grabmal einer großen Liebe (Germany title)

Actor
Karma (1933)
Prapancha Pash (1929) / A Throw of Dice (English title) / Schicksalswürfel (Germany title)
Shiraz (1928) / Grabmal einer großen Liebe (Germany title)
Prem Sanyas (1925) / Leuchte Asiens (Germany title)

Writer
Achhut Kanya (1936) / Untouchable Girl (English title)

Director
Prem Sanyas (1925) / Leuchte Asiens (Germany title)

References

External links

Bombay talkies and her forgotten heroes
Najam-Ul-Hasan

1892 births
1940 deaths
People from Cuttack
Bengali Hindus
Indian male film actors
Film producers from Odisha
Male actors in Hindi cinema
20th-century Indian male actors
Hindi-language film directors
20th-century Indian film directors
Hindi film producers
Male actors from Odisha
Film directors from Odisha